Weak form and strong form may refer to:
Weaker and stronger versions of a hypothesis, theorem or physical law
Weak formulations and strong formulations of differential equations in mathematics
Differing pronunciations of words depending on emphasis; see Weak and strong forms in English
Weak and strong pronouns

See also
Weakened weak form (mathematics)
Clitic (linguistics)
Weak inflection (linguistics)
Strong (disambiguation)
Weak (disambiguation)